Reference Re Farm Products Marketing Act (Ontario), 1957 S.C.R. 198 is a leading Supreme Court of Canada decision on the Trade and Commerce power allocated to the federal government under section 91(2) of the Constitution Act, 1867. The Court held that the Trade and Commerce power applied not just to trade but also to the flow of goods.

The Ontario Farm Products Marketing Act was challenged as ultra vires the province. The Court split four to four on whether the law was valid.

Chief Justice Fauteux, held that the Act had an effect on inter-provincial trade and so it could not be upheld as a "matter of a local nature" under section 92 (16) of the Constitution Act, 1867. Rather, the Act concerned the "flow of goods" which was part of the Trade power. Rand J., in a concurring opinion, added that the demarcation between trade, production, and manufacturing must be considered. “That demarcation must observe this rule, that if in a trade activity, including manufacture or production, there is involved a matter of extraprovincial interest or concern its regulation thereafter in the aspect of trade is by that fact put beyond Provincial power.” Consequently, some intra-provincial trade can be regulated federally as well as inter-provincial trade.

See also
 List of Supreme Court of Canada cases

External links
 
 Ontario Farm Marketing Act

Canadian federalism case law
Supreme Court of Canada cases
1957 in Canadian case law
Supreme Court of Canada reference question cases